A dishwasher is a person who washes and dries dishware, cookware, and cutlery, often in a "back of house" restaurant setting

Duties and functions
Most dishwashers work in a restaurant setting. Typically, dishwashers scrape food residue from dishes, pots and kitchen utensils; sort and load racks of dirty dishes into a commercial dishwashing machine. They organize and place clean dishes and other smallwares back in their respective storage location. Additionally, they wash by hand larger items and utensils in large sinks that are usually designated for that task. Depending on the operation, they might have additional cleaning duties.

The job requirements are normally physically demanding and fast-paced. Dishwasher uniforms are usually covered with personal protective equipment to keep the user dry; these normally include a waterproof full-length apron, tall waterproof rubber boots, and long heavy-duty waterproof gloves.

The dishwasher in a commercial kitchen is frequently an entry-level job that can lead to a career in food preparation. That being said, many operations rely on the capabilities of an experienced dishwasher crew in the "dish pit".

A 2008 study by the Pew Hispanic Center reported that many illegal immigrants to the United States worked as dishwashers.

See also
 Dishwasher Pete – memoirs of a writer who supported himself for more than a decade working as a dishwasher in all 50 US states

References

External links
 /r/dishwashers, a reddit community for dishwashers to talk about their work
Dishwashers, Occupational Employment and Wages, May 2015, a report from the United States Bureau of Labor Statistics
Dishwasher sample resume, provided by a job search service
 Professional Dish-Washer Shares Tales From the Pit

Dishwashing
Food services occupations